Ndeye Meïssa Diaw (born 10 December 1994) is a Senegalese footballer who plays as a goalkeeper for Lycée Ameth Fall and the Senegal women's national team.

Club career
Diaw has played for Lycée Ameth Fall in Saint-Louis, Senegal.

International career
Diaw capped for Senegal at senior level during the 2022 Africa Women Cup of Nations qualification.

References

External links

1994 births
Living people
Sportspeople from Saint-Louis, Senegal
Senegalese women's footballers
Women's association football goalkeepers
Senegal women's international footballers